In British folklore, the Beast of Bodmin Moor, is a phantom wild cat purported to live in Cornwall, England. Bodmin Moor became a centre of purported sightings after 1978, with occasional reports of mutilated slain livestock; the alleged panther/ leopard-like black cats of the same region came to be popularly known as the Beast of Bodmin Moor.

In general, scientists reject such claims because of the improbably large numbers necessary to maintain a breeding population and because climate and food supply issues would make such purported creatures' survival in reported habitats unlikely.

Investigation
A long-held hypothesis suggests the possibility that alien big cats at large in the United Kingdom could have been imported as part of private collections or zoos, then later escaped or set free.  An escaped big cat would not be reported to the authorities due to the illegality of owning and importing the animals. It has been claimed that animal trainer Mary Chipperfield released three pumas into the wild following the closure of her Plymouth zoo in 1978 and that subsequent sightings of the animals gave rise to rumours of the Beast.

The Ministry of Agriculture, Fisheries and Food conducted an official investigation in 1995 led by investigators Simon Baker and Charles Wilson. On 19 July 1995 the study found that there was "no verifiable evidence" of exotic felines loose in Britain and that the mauled farm animals could have been attacked by common indigenous species. The report stated that "no verifiable evidence for the presence of a 'big cat' was found ... There is no significant threat to livestock from a 'big cat' in Bodmin Moor".

Skull
Less than a week after the government report, on 24 July 1995, a boy was walking by the River Fowey when he discovered a large cat skull. The story hit the national press at about the same time as the official denial of alien big cat evidence on Bodmin Moor.

The skull was sent to the Natural History Museum in London for verification.  A team of entomologists and zoologists from the Natural History Museum in London determined that it was a genuine skull from a young male leopard, but also found that the cat had not died in Britain and that the skull had been imported as part of a leopard-skin rug. The back of the skull was cleanly cut off in a way that is commonly used to mount the head on a rug. There was an egg case inside the skull that had been laid by a tropical cockroach that could not possibly be found in Britain. There were also cut marks on the skull indicating the flesh had been scraped off with a knife, and the skull had begun to decompose only after a recent immersion in water.

Soon after the discovery, an investigation held in December 1997 was incited by bite marks on farm animals, droppings, and new photographs, one of which was taken through binoculars close to St. Austell, Cornwall, and evidently showed an adult pregnant female jaguar.

See also

Beast of Buchan
Beast of Exmoor
British big cats

References

Bodmin
Monsters
Cornish folklore
Cornish legendary creatures
English legendary creatures
Cat folklore
Mythological felines